Geruma (also known as Gerema, Germa) is an Afro-Asiatic language spoken in Nigeria.  Dialects include Duurum and Sum.  Speakers are shifting to Hausa.

Notes 

West Chadic languages
Languages of Nigeria